Leukai may refer to:
Souda (island) and Leon (Souda Bay), islands off Crete
Leucae (Laconia), town of ancient Laconia, Greece
Leukai (Ionia), ancient city of Ionia, now in Turkey
Osmaneli, Turkey

See also
Leucae (disambiguation)